Ésta es mi vida, meaning "This Is My Life" in Spanish, may refer to:

This Is My Life (1952 film)
Esta Es Mi Vida, an album by Jesse & Joy